Nicolas Appels (born 6 February 1896) was a Belgian wrestler. He competed in the men's Greco-Roman light heavyweight at the 1928 Summer Olympics.

References

External links
 

1896 births
Year of death missing
Belgian male sport wrestlers
Olympic wrestlers of Belgium
Wrestlers at the 1928 Summer Olympics